These are the official results of the athletics competition at the 1990 Goodwill Games which took place between July 22 and 26, 1990, at the Husky Stadium in Seattle, Washington, United States.

Men's results

100 meters
July 23Wind: +1.1 m/s

200 meters
July 24

400 meters
July 24

800 meters
July 22

1500 meters
July 23

5000 meters
July 22

10,000 meters
July 25

Marathon
July 22

110 meters hurdles
July 23

400 meters hurdles
July 22

3000 meters steeplechase
July 24

4 x 100 meters relay
July 26

4 x 400 meters relay
July 26

20,000 meters walk
July 22

High jump
July 26

Pole vault
July 22

Long jump
July 25

Triple jump
July 26

Shot put
July 25

Discus throw
July 23

Hammer throw
July 26

Javelin throw
July 24

Decathlon
July 24–25

Women's results

100 meters
July 23Wind: 0.0 m/s

200 meters
July 25

400 meters
July 22

800 meters
July 23

1500 meters
July 25

3000 meters
July 23

5000 meters
July 24

10,000 meters
July 26

Marathon
July 22

100 meters hurdles
July 23

400 meters hurdles
July 26

4 x 100 meters relay
July 26

4 x 400 meters relay
July 26

10,000 meters walk
July 24

High jump
July 23

Long jump
July 24

Shot put
July 24

Discus throw
July 22

Javelin throw
July 25

Heptathlon
July 22–23

References

July 22 results
July 23 results
July 24 results
July 25 results
July 26 results

1990
Goodwill Games